Tile Map Service or TMS, is a specification for tiled web maps, developed by the Open Source Geospatial Foundation. The definition generally requires a URI structure which attempts to fulfill REST principles. The TMS protocol fills a gap between the very simple standard used by OpenStreetMap and the complexity of the Web Map Service standard, providing simple urls to tiles while also supporting alternate spatial referencing system.

Support

TMS is most widely supported by web mapping clients and servers; although there is some desktop support, the Web Map Service protocol is more widespread for enterprise mapping applications. The OpenLayers JavaScript library supports TMS natively, while the Google Maps API allows URL templating, which makes support possible for developers. TileCache is one of the most popular supporting servers, while other servers like mod tile and TileLite focus on the de facto OpenStreetMap standard.

WMTS

TMS served as the basis for the OpenGIS Web Map Tile Service OGC standard.

See also 
 Tiled web map

References

External links
 TMS Specification, OSGeo-Wiki
Free software server implementation of the TMS specification:
 TileCache
 MapProxy
 ROK4
 MapServer MapCache

 
Open Geospatial Consortium